Line 13 (Jade), also known as the Guarulhos Train, is one of the seven lines operated by CPTM and one of the thirteen lines that make up the São Paulo Metro Rail Transport Network. It connects the Engenheiro Goulart Station in São Paulo to the Guarulhos Airport Station, in the city of Guarulhos.

Opened on March 31, 2018, it was the first line completely built and operated by CPTM. That makes São Paulo's Guarulhos Airport the first major international airport in South America to be directly served by train.

History
Work has been authorized on September 23, 2013, and was initially expected to be completed in 2015. The line finally opened in 2018.

Special Services

On November 19, 2020, during the deliver of the fourth train CRRC Qingdao Sifang 2500 Series, Secretary of Transports Alexandre Baldy confirmed a new express service, which started operating on December 1, 2020. The new service connects Luz and Aeroporto Guarulhos stations, with stops at Guarulhos-CECAP and Brás (towards Luz only). The trains depart every hour from both terminus stations from 5 AM to midnight and there is no special fare for this service.

It was available since October 3, 2018 the special service Connect, which consisted of trains between Brás Station and Guarulhos Airport Station during peak hours (from 5:40am to 8:20am and from 5:20pm to 8:00pm), with no need to exchange trains at Engenheiro Goulart Station, offering direct access to São Paulo city center and also easier connections to other subway lines. There was no special fare for this service. The service was suspended in March 2020 and on November 16, 2020, Secretary Baldy confirmed that Airport Connect service was officially extinct.

There were also express trains between Luz Station and Guarulhos Airport Station during specific timetables: 10am, 12pm, 2pm, 4pm and 10pm from Luz towards the Airport and 9am, 11am, 1pm, 3pm and 9pm from the Airport towards Luz. There was a convenience fare for this service: $8,60 BRL ($ USD), twice the price of normal fare at the time.

Future expansion
Original plans for Line 13 consisted of an underground route from Engenheiro Goulart to Chácara Klabin via the city centre, however this is expected to be replaced by using existing overground tracks from Engenheiro Goulart to Luz Station. A northward extension is planned from the airport to Bonsucesso in Guarulhos.

Stations

Gallery

References

External links

 Official page of the CPTM
 Secretaria dos Transportes Metropolitanos
 CPTM

Companhia Paulista de Trens Metropolitanos
CPTM 13
Railway lines opened in 2018